Carol Theresa Vaness (born July 27, 1952) is an American lirico-spinto soprano and university professor.

Early life and education
Vaness was born in San Diego and graduated with her bachelor's degree from California State Polytechnic University, Pomona.  She later attended California State University, Northridge where she earned her master's degree in 1976.

Career
Vaness launched her professional career in 1977 with the San Francisco Opera.  She appeared regularly at the New York City Opera from 1979 to 1983. She made her Metropolitan Opera debut in 1984 and has sung at many of the major opera houses of Europe, including Teatro alla Scala, the Vienna State Opera, Paris Opera, and the Royal Opera House/Covent Garden. In 1993 she performed the role of Duchess Elena in I vespri siciliani with the Washington Concert Opera.

She was particularly known for her Mozart operatic roles, but she has performed in a wide range of operas, including the title role in Giacomo Puccini's Manon Lescaut with the Seattle Opera.  Her interpretations of Mozart's dramatic heroines, including Fiordiligi in Così fan tutte, Donna Anna and Donna Elvira in Don Giovanni, Elettra in Idomeneo, and Vitellia in La Clemenza di Tito, have been hailed as definitive, and she has become especially identifiable with the role of Tosca, which she performed at the Metropolitan Opera in 2004 opposite Luciano Pavarotti in the legendary tenor's final operatic performance.

Vaness made her professional debut as Vitellia for the San Francisco Spring Opera and has been acknowledged as the world's leading interpreter of this role. She has appeared as Vitellia at the Metropolitan Opera, Paris Opera, Royal Opera Covent Garden, Lyric Opera of Chicago, New York City Opera, Liceu, and at the Salzburg Festival and other leading theaters.

Among her celebrated television appearances, she has been featured on the Pavarotti Plus and Pavarotti and Friends telecasts from Lincoln Center, as well as the Richard Tucker Gala and In Performance at the White House with members of the New York City Opera.

Vaness teaches in the renowned voice department of Indiana University.  Her hire came as part of the school's "Commitment to Excellence" program, which also brought the matriculation of Jaime Laredo, André Watts, and Joshua Bell.  She is a tenured professor of voice working with individual students as well as conducting the opera workshop classes.  She began teaching in 2006, and a number of her students have gone to win major nationwide and international competitions and positions in young artist programs.

Discography
 A Salute to American Music: Richard Tucker Music Foundation Gala XVI, 1991, RCA, 1992
 The Faces of Love: The Songs of Jake Heggie, RCA, 1999

Videography
 James Levine's 25th Anniversary Metropolitan Opera Gala (1996), Deutsche Grammophon DVD, B0004602-09

References

1952 births
American operatic sopranos
California State Polytechnic University, Pomona alumni
Living people
Jacobs School of Music faculty
Singers from California
Musicians from San Diego
20th-century American women opera singers
21st-century American women opera singers
Classical musicians from California
Women music educators